The Organization of American States Secretary General election was a series of special sessions of the General Assembly of the Organization of American States (OAS) held during 2005 in Washington, D.C., United States to elect a new Secretary General. The first special session, held on 11 April 2005 at the OAS headquarters, ended in a tie between Chile's Interior Minister José Miguel Insulza and Mexico's Foreign Minister Luis Ernesto Derbez, and forced the Organization to schedule a second round of elections for 2 May 2005 to end the unprecedented stalemate. On 29 April 2005, Mexico withdrew its candidate, which allowed Chile's Insulza to be elected in the next special session as Secretary General, with 31 votes, two abstentions and one vote left blank.

Background and candidates
On 8 October 2004, the newly elected Secretary General, former president of Costa Rica Miguel Ángel Rodríguez, facing corruption allegations in his home country, announced his resignation from the OAS position, effective 15 October. Assistant Secretary General Luigi R. Einaudi (a U.S. career diplomat) assumed the office as a temporary measure. After a period of uncertainty lasting several months, it was decided that rather than wait until the regular General Assembly (to take place in Fort Lauderdale, United States, in June 2005), a special session of the General Assembly would be held at OAS headquarters on 7 April 2005; that date was later changed to 11 April, due to Pope John Paul II's funeral.

Three candidates emerged for the post:

Francisco Flores Pérez, former president of El Salvador
Luis Ernesto Derbez, foreign minister of Mexico
José Miguel Insulza, interior minister of Chile

Francisco Flores's nomination had the official support of the United States, and he was thought to be a "joint Central American" candidate to replace Rodríguez, given that consensus was that it was Central America's "turn" to head the OAS.

Derbez's candidacy was officially launched by President of Mexico Vicente Fox on 7 December 2004. Derbez claimed to have the support of Belize, Bolivia, Canada, Honduras and Saint Vincent and the Grenadines.

Chile announced Insulza as its candidate two days later; it claimed the support of Argentina, Brazil, Ecuador, Venezuela, Uruguay and most of the Caribbean Community (CARICOM)-bloc member states.  Derbez's nomination came as a surprise to Chile, because it was Mexico who had proposed Chile to nominate Insulza.  In an unexplained move, Mexico, knowing Chile was near announcing Insulza, declared Derbez its candidate first.

On 8 April 2005, Francisco Flores withdrew his candidacy. He alleged the race was becoming too divisive for the Mesoamerican region. He also had the fewest supporters of the three. Flores, who initially appeared a promising choice, began losing support as the negotiations progressed. Up until Flores's withdrawal from the race, the U.S. State Department maintained that it wanted a Central American ex-president, and that Flores was its choice. Flores had the endorsement of El Salvador, Guatemala, Costa Rica, Nicaragua, and the Dominican Republic; significantly, from the earliest days of campaigning, neighboring Honduras said it would be unable to support Flores.

First round election

On 11 April 2005, the foreign ministers of the American nations (or their plenipotentiary representatives) gathered to elect the new Secretary General. Three successive rounds of voting resulted in a tie, with 17 votes going for each of the two candidates. After a recess of slightly over two hours, fourth and fifth ballots were held which also failed to break the tie. A press report published in the Buenos Aires daily La Nación on 12 April indicated that during that break, Roger Noriega of the U.S. state department and the foreign ministers of the Mercosur countries had been able to convince Grenada and Paraguay, respectively, to change their votes. Thus, although the fourth and fifth rounds also resulted in ties, the distribution of votes was allegedly different from the breakdown in the first three. Because of this unprecedented stalemate, in a private 30-minute gathering the states' representatives decided that a new vote would take place on 2 May 2005.

Voting breakdown
This is a list of the member countries according to their statements of official support for one or other of the candidates, together with inferences of the voting intentions of the other states as reported in the international press. All 34 active member nations of the OAS were entitled to one vote each. An absolute majority (18 votes) was needed to win the election.

For the purposes of the following table, the OAS member states have been grouped into four regional blocs:

Luis Ernesto Derbez
Declared votes

Undeclared likely votes

José Miguel Insulza
Declared votes

Undeclared likely votes

Second round election

Even though the 2 May re-run of the election allowed new contenders to stand in addition to the two existing candidates, no new candidates emerged. The press had initially speculated that Manuel Rodríguez Cuadros, the current foreign minister of Peru, would have been a likely  "consensus" candidate in the new scenario, and on 12 April, the Lima daily Perú 21 gave the name of former transitional president Valentín Paniagua as another option. As the weeks progressed, however, nothing further was heard about a Peruvian candidacy. The Canadian media also suggested that their foreign minister Pierre Pettigrew may be a candidate in the second round, but Pettigrew was dissuaded by Prime Minister Paul Martin. The continuing deadlock appeared to be broken with Haiti's 27 April announcement of its intention to support Insulza in the second round (Haiti was believed to have voted for Derbez in the first election).

Both Derbez and Insulza initially confirmed that they would remain in the race. However, in a surprise development, and after intense negotiations between Mexico, Chile and the United States at the third Ministerial Meeting of the Community of Democracies in Santiago, Chile, on 29 April, Colombian foreign minister Carolina Barco announced that Derbez was withdrawing his candidacy, "in order to prevent a breakdown of hemispheric relations". This left Insulza as the sole candidate for the post.

At the Thirtieth Special Session of the General Assembly held on 2 May 2005, José Miguel Insulza was duly elected to serve as Secretary General of the Organization of American States. Voting was 31 in favor, two abstentions (believed to have been Mexico and Bolivia), and one vote left blank (announced in advance by Peru). Insulza took office on 26 May.

See also
United States-Latin American relations

References

Prior to the election
English language
Chile leads race for OAS top post with backing from 11 CARICOM members (Agence France-Presse via Caribbean Net News, 4 April)
Caricom split on backing Chile  (Trinidad and Tobago Express, 4 April)
America: Region Divided in Three by Race for OAS Leadership  (IPS, 17 March)
Mexican-Chilean Partnership – "No matter the outcome of the OAS race, one of its certain casualties has been the Mexican-Chilean partnership." (Council on Hemispheric Affairs, 7 April)
Insulza Likely to Become New OAS Sec-Gen (Council on Hemispheric Affairs, 11 April)
Spanish language
Da Ecuador su voto a Insulza para dirigir OEA (El Universal, Mexico City, 12 February)
Prevén ventaja de Derbez en OEA por renuncia de Flores (AP via El Universal online, Mexico City, 8 April)

First round of voting
English language
OAS stalemate in leader election (BBC News, 11 April)
Deadlock in Ballot for New Secretary General (VOA, 11 April)
Spanish language
Se consagra empate entre Insulza y Derbez en la OEA  (La Nación, Santiago, 11 April)
Opción de Insulza queda en suspenso en la OEA tras cinco empates seguidos  (El Mercurio en Internet, Santiago, 11 April)
Ni con el apoyo tardío de EU logra Derbez más votos (La Jornada, Mexico City, 12 April)
Inesperado traspié de EE.UU.en la OEA (La Nación, Buenos Aires, 12 April)

Prior to second round
English language
Thwarted Election Hurts OAS (Oxford Analytica via Forbes, 18 April)
Chilean to lead OAS after US compromise (Financial Times, London, 29 April)
Chilean poised to become OAS head (BBC News, 29 April)
O.A.S. to Pick Chile Socialist U.S. Opposed as Its Leader (The New York Times, New York, 30 April)
Remarks by Mr. Insulza following Derbez's withdrawal (US Department of State)
Spanish language
Evalúa Perú si presentará candidato a OEA (AP via El Universal online, Mexico City, 12 April)
Gazmuri: Haití asegura apoyo a Insulza  (Orbe via El Mercurio online, Santiago, 27 April)
Espera Derbez retiro de candidatura de Insulza (El Universal, 29 April)
México pretendió evitar una ruptura: Derbez (El Universal, 29 April)

Second round
English language
OAS Press Release (Washington, DC, 2 May)
OAS photo gallery
Chile candidate becomes OAS head (BBC News, 2 May)
OAS elects Chile's Insulza as new leader (Reuters, 2 May)
A pesar de Perú y Bolivia, Insulza es elegido en la OEA  (El Mercurio en Internet, Santiago, 2 May)

2005 elections
2005 elections in North America
2005 elections in South America
2005 in North America
2005 in South America
Organization of American States
Intergovernmental elections